Those Days may refer to:

 Those Days (novel)
 Those Days (song)

See also
 In Those Days, a 1947 German film
 One of Those Days (disambiguation)
 These Days (disambiguation)